Said Zakirovich Gafurov (born 1967) is a Russian politician, economist, sociologist, orientalist, bureaucrat and opera critic.

Early life 

Gafurov is a Gorky Tatar (Mishar) by origin. He is a son of Professor Gafurov Zakerya Shagizanovich – colonel, professional revolutionary, creator of the theory of the construction of revolutionary armies in developing countries and Gafurova (Khusainova) Anisa Sofovna – a professional artist, secretary of the Moscow Union of Artists. Gafurov graduated in 1992 from the College of Asian and African studies at Moscow State University. In 1997, he defended his Ph.D. dissertation at the Faculty of Economics of the Moscow State University. He was a Counselor of the Russian Federation. He is an author of monographs and articles.  Gafurov married Darya Mitina – a prominent Russian Communist leader, Secretary of the United Communist Party, former co-chairperson of the Left Front (Russia), 1st Secretary of Russian Komsomol and former member of State Duma. Together they have two sons.

In accordance with Russian literary tradition, as an editor, Gafurov often uses numerous pen-names such as "Эльбрус Бюджетников", "Софья Антиохийская", "Лукреция и Брунгильда Рабиновитц", etc. Normally these pen names do not confuse readers.

Government service 
Under the Yevgeniy Primakov government, Gafurov served as Director of the Department of State property of Finance, Credit, Insurance, and Foreign Trade organizations of the Ministry of State Property of Russia. Later he served as a Counselor for Russian Inter-budget relations in the Ministry of Regional Development.

Beginning in 2011 Gafurov worked as Deputy Chief Editor responsible for economic issues of the Russian monthly journal VVP (Gross Domestic Product)  known for active support of Vladimir Putin. Under his guidance VVP became one of the most significant bastions of champions of neo-Keynesian and Marxist anti-neo-liberal economic policy in Russia. Nevertheless, the Russian liberals valued Gafurov highly and the Russian liberal Government (Ministry of Industry and Trade, Ministry of Economic Development, and Ministry of Energy - but never Ministry of Finance) regularly employed Gafurov as a consultant for foreign economic relations issues.

For various Russian Economic Ministries Gafurov wrote monographs on Russian foreign economic relations, including "The WTO mechanisms and non-discriminatory operations of Russian oil and gas companies in the European Energy markets" (M. 2014), "The initiative 'Partnership for Modernization' and the Russian national interests" (M. 2013); "The Intergovernmental Commissions and the modernization of the Russian economy" (M.2011).

Anti-crisis policy 
Based on the crises of 1998-1999 (Gafurov then was in the Government), 2008-2009 and 2014 - the present, Gafurov elaborated a concept of Mismatch ("Рассогласование") or Disbalance ("Разбалансировка") of Credit-Monetary and Fiscal-Budget policies as the main reason of the ineffectiveness of anti-crisis policy. Both the Central Bank and the Ministry of Finance  rejected the conclusions of Gafurov based on the absence of such mismatch. However, many meaningful points of Gafurov's concept remained unanswered.

Scholar

Political economy, theory of property 
Gafurov is the author of an empirical research monography "Essay on Experience of Comparative Analysis of Privatization and Formation of Corporate Securities Markets in Developing and Post-socialist Countries in 1991-1996" (Moscow State University. Dialog, Moscow, 2000) and works on the theory and practice of the political economy of property.

In 2013 Gafurov started working in the field of reorganization of international political-economic networks guided by Prof. Alexander Buzgalin. Gafurov regularly spoke at international political-economic Congresses, stressing high-scale social demand for political-economic research from the State and business. In his anti-crisis policy concept, Gafurov followed the Keynesian approach. He created a model of interrelations between credit-monetary and fiscal-budget (and anti-monopoly) policies based on institutional differences between governmental bodies.

Equity research 
In the late 90s, in several articles in the journal of Рынок ценных бумаг (Securities market), Gafurov elaborated an original approach to equity research based on the mathematical concept of Ergodic theory. The so-called "Gafurov theorem" states that statistical methods can be used in equity research if only the time series of securities' prices are subject to Ergodicity principles. The practical significance of the theorem is in its first corollary (Gafurov calls it "Lemma") based on the Bayesian approach. When forecasting the market based on the experience gained, the forecast error increases by the size of the (future, not yet known) changes in the market. This means that, during crises, decisions could not be taken based on the forecast level of market decline, as it is unpredictable in principle. Decisions on market entry and exit must be taken on other principles of portfolio management. The compendium of Gafurov's ideas on equity research and securities analysis was published in the monograph (based on Seria of articles) "The philosophy of Equity research".

In 2021 a textbook for university students by Gafurov "Foresee the future and get rich! Philosophy, Ethics, and Algebra of Securities Analysis" (Заглянуть в будущее и разбогатеть! Философия, этика и алгебра фондового анализа) was published in Moscow and Berlin ("DirectMedia Publishing", Moscow/Berlin, 2021).

Orientalism 
In early 2019 the Russian-German Publishing house "Direct-media" published a book by Gafurov "The Cross, the Crescent and the Arab nation: ideological currents in the Middle East, which is a compendium of the basic ideas of Gafurov's orientalism. The introduction to the book is a short review of Gafurov's philosophical and methodological principles. The Russian critic called the book influential but controversial stressing that "Gafurov is trying to break the discourse on Arab countries imposed on Russia from the outside".
  
Gafurov is an author of a short article on the philosophical ideas of Libyan leader Muammar Gaddafi (translated to some European, Arabic and African languages). Its most interesting point is that Gafurov proves that ideas of Gaddafi are similar to those of anarchists.

He is an author of works on the economy, privatization and development of economies, privatization, and securities markets of the Arabic, and Asiatic and African countries.

Gafurov also works on the problems of Islamic sects: ismailism, druzes, and alawisms. He, in particular, supposed that all distinctions between flows in Islam (sunnizm and different directions of shiizm) were actually taken to the questions of implementation of law, but not dogmatic or personal reasons, because in an order to be a Muslim it is necessary and enough to make public acceptance of credo of faith, consisting only of two propositions: (1) that there is only one god (tawhid) and (2) that Muhammed is one of his prophets.

He supposed that registration of separate flow is a problem of codification and creation of a separate, independent "mazkhab" (a legal school and norms of laws), distinguishing this flow from other directions in Islam.

Gafurov defended the memory of Al-Hakim bi-Amr Allah – an assassinated Fatimid caliph who was later claimed insane by Ismailities, Christians and Sunnites, and deified by the Druzes as well as defense of Syrian and Turkish Alawites.

Marxist studies and political philosophy 
Gafurov is a Russian Marxist thinker. He belongs to the school of Alexander Buzgalin, who was the supervisor of his Ph.D. thesis. Despite this connection, Gafurov's ideas are close to Marxist positivism and he moved far away from dialectical metaphysics of Buzgalin. Gafurov rejects concepts of the Asiatic mode of production and the State capitalism nature of the Soviet Union (based on analysis of the role of credit relations in the USSR and State Capitalist countries). In local politics, he defends the idea of reconciliation of Stalinist, Trotskyist and Maoist tendencies based on the idea that the differences have only historical significance.

Since the first term of president Putin, Gafurov has elaborated the concept of Russian Bonapartism and the attempts by the bourgeoisie for Liberal Revenge.

He champions the quantitative theory of imperialism, which means holds that any stronger imperialism is worse than any weaker one. That contradicts the Leninist defeatist position. Gafurov's position allows tactical alliances with weaker imperialist approaches such as Russian or Iranian imperialism. Gafurov rejects the existence of Chinese imperialism, although he supports Vietnam in its conflict on the Paracel islands while supporting China in all other conflicts in the South China Sea.

Psycholinguistics 
Gafurov asserted that the hypocrisy and duplicity of the Anglo-Saxon peoples have deep roots and are associated with the grammar of the English language. Referring to the tradition of St. Augustin, Gafurov stressed that the past is an integral part of current existence. The present is a fleeting moment. A human is his past, no more and no less, and a nation is its history.

Stressing that no nation other than the US has ever used nuclear weapons against cities, Gafurov claimed that the Americans do not understand the hypocrisy of their position on nuclear non-proliferation because they use the simple past tense for the nuclear bombing of Nagasaki and Hiroshima.

Political views

Geopolitics 
Gafurov disapproves of NATO, neocolonialism and neo-racism, and is sharply critical of current European Union policy in Africa and in Europe.

Gafurov is one of the leaders of the Russian Social Forum movement. Gafurov participated in writing program documents about the Russian Movement in defense of Labour (which was sharply criticized for its position in support of Putin in his struggle against the restoration of neoliberalism). In 2017 Gafurov was one of the key organizers of the World Festival of Youth and Students in Sochi, Russia. He made at least 11 speeches during the Festival.

In October 2020, Gafurov was the first on Russian TV to proclaim internationalism as the only possible basis for achieving an Armenian-Azerbaijani settlement. This position met with fierce criticism from both Armenian and Azerbaijani nationalists.

Political science 
In 2016 -2017 he formulated the so-called "Gafurov postulate" of political science on Russian TV. According to this hypothesis, in any election "from the United States to the DPRK, from India to Russia, from Switzerland to the People's China, from Germany to Syria," the number of illegal, "thrown in" votes is approximately the same, in cases of one or two candidates ranging from 5% to 10% of votes. Gafurov assumes the existence of a stable mathematical expectation of this figure in the presence of a sufficiently large number of polling stations and a large number of elections. "Gafurov's Political Science Hypothesis" is used to calculate the budgets of election campaigns in Russia.

Gafurov had struggled to support the Syrian government, but after direct involvement of Russian forces in the Syrian conflict, he started to speak against the main line of Russian propaganda. Nevertheless, his views are accepted by the Kremlin.

Syria 
Since 2011 Gafurov has actively supported the Syrian government in the Russian media, including Russian media in foreign languages. Gafurov was a Deputy Chairman of the Russian Committee for Solidarity with Peoples of Libya and Syria since its founding. Gafurov defended the Syrian government during the uprising in Deraa pointing out that it was a struggle for arable land between the Druzes and Bedouins.

Gafurov created an idea that in order to settle the Syrian crisis the Russian Foreign Policy should get a support from the United States Catholic lobby.

Libya 
In 2011 during the popular uprising in Libya, Gafurov became one of the most prominent Gaddafi supporters in Russia, though Gafurov claimed that he did not take sides, stating: "Any barricade has only two sides. And if there are your enemies on both it simply means that this is not your barricade".

However, in practice, Gafurov's articles defended Kaddafi's side based on
 the thesis that the uprising is a tribal reaction to Gaddafi's attempts to modernise Libya;
 the fact that the insurgents were led by the former Minister of Justice in Gaddafi's government;
 the economic interests of Russia's oil and gas sector.
Gafourov's article that Russian President Dmitry Medvedev was cheated by US Vice-President Joe Biden who promised to send US Defense Secretary Robert Gates to Russia before implementation of the United Nations Security Council Resolution 1973 which caused a large controversy in Russian political circles and was followed by the public exchange of opinions between Russian President Medvedev and Prime-Minister Putin.

Ukraine 
In February 2014 Gafurov declared what he considered should be the principles of Ukrainian settlement: 
 Down with the fascist self-proclaimed government in Kyiv and its IMF-inspired economic program
 No annexation of Crimea by Russia
 Federalisation of Ukraine so that the regions of Ukraine have the right to self-determination to choose between (a) Euro-integration (b) a free-trade zone with the Customs Union of Russia, Kazakhstan, and Belarus (c) independence from both.
Later on, Gafurov changed his position on Crimea based on the fact that the economic politics of the Ukrainian oligarchy putschists since the 2014 coup d'état had destroyed the economy of Ukraine; and that the Crimean people (including the Crimean Tatars) would not agree to return to the misery and poverty of the post-democratic dictatorship of Ukraine regardless of a heartless but rich Russian Bureaucracy regime.

In February 2017, Gafurov in his political TV-show on the Pravda.ru channel publicly promised that he would start a campaign to return Crimea to Ukraine the day after the USA returned Texas, California, New Mexico and Arizona to Mexico.

Because of his public statements Gafurov is suspected to be one of the organizers of a secret channel to transfer refugees - mainly members of the Communist Party of Ukraine, Borotba and other leftist organizations, who were persecuted and tortured at Maidan and some other regions in Ukraine - to Russia.

Africa 
In 2016 Gafurov twice spoke at the Congresses of the POLISARIO in Algeria as a guest.
 
Gafurov supported Côte d'Ivoire President Laurent Gbagbo against another Côte d'Ivoire President Alassane Ouattara.

Environmentalism 
In the fall of 2020, the St. Petersburg publishing house "Peter" published the controversial book "Combat Ecology"  by Said Gafurov and Daria Mitina, which met with fierce criticism.

Art critic 
In 2012 Gafurov became dissatisfied with the level of Russian opera criticism. He began writing operatic criticisms in Russian media including Literaturnaya gazeta, Pravda.ru, Svobodnaya pressa, as a result of the sharp rise in the level of Russian opera since the beginning of the millennium. He has concentrated on the social aspects of the theatrical side of opera and less on the musical side. It is accepted that Gafurov has reestablished the school of Marxist opera critic in Russian.  Gafurov believes that opera should be a working-class art.

Russian criticism  

Gafurov is the author of works on philosophy and psychology. Gafurov introduces material on stock market philosophy and psychology, as well as mathematical concepts that are not common among Russian specialists in the humanities. He was criticized for the "dilettantism" in his psychological and philosophical works, but these charges were dropped by his opponents, usually as a result of scientific discussions.

It is generally accepted that works by Gafurov are characterized by excessive rigor, unduly restricting the subject of psychology and philosophy to ensure formal scientific consistency.

His epistemological views can be described as extreme nominalism. He stressed:

In ontology "existence", as Gafurov understands it, is "the ability to provide any object three spatial and one temporal coordinates." In general, the epistemological views of Gafurov are close to Marxist positivism.

In the field of aesthetics, Gafurov's views are characterized by snobbery, arrogance, and mechanistics. Thus, he denies any aesthetic value of modern popular music, considering it to be "a set of ordered acoustic vibrations, which can be compared with each other". Comparing the elementary theory of music popular music and classical music, Gafurov shows that popular music is a "primitive step back, an expression of the class will of the bourgeoisie to the stupefaction of the working people." He categorically opposed the idea that classical music and popular music are "incomparable". Gafurov consistently pursued the idea that an "absence of taste" and "bad taste" are fundamentally different things. Bad taste according to Gafurov is "love for Haydn and no love for Brahms". The absence of taste is to be "more likely to listen to popular singers than good symphonic orchestra."

Gafurov understands ethics only as narrative, "positive, rather than normative": "... Ethics and behavior are subject to the same laws. If you think about it, ethics is a function of expediency. ... Ethics is the feasibility of changing the external conditions ". Peremptory ethical norms do not exist for him.

Gafurov reduces the subject of psychology to the analysis of experimental data. The subject of psychology, he said, is "the higher nervous activity". Gafurov's ideas are characterized by the reduction of mass psychology (although he denies the very existence of the subject of study in "Social Psychology") in rational behavior and the subject of research, he sees in the analysis of the hidden rationality in irrationality at first glance, the behavior of the masses. Gafurov's researches are in stark contrast to his own methodological orientations. The notion of a hidden rationality contradicts the notion that subject of psychology is only the analysis of experiments.

Intellectual property 
Gafurov is an open though careful opponent of the concept of Intellectual property. He states: "Letters are everyone's property" ("Буквы принадлежат всем!"). He argues his position on the common good and the fact that anyhow the state and philanthropists sponsor most of the modern culture. It puts Gafurov in rather anecdotical and hypocritical position when he invites to his TV-shows Russian scenario play-writers or Russian composers (including the Chairman of the Russian Composers Union Andrey Baturin) involved in copyright disputes. He was one of the first Russian scholars who published his Ph.D. dissertation on the internet as early as 1996. This led to his involvement in some Russian Dissernet scandals as a source of violated copyright. In the 2010s Gafurov was several times accused by his opponents in Plagiarism by publishing under his name short news articles from Greek, Indian and Bengali radical Marxist sources (which if not signed by Gafurov would have unlikely been published by Russian mainstream media).

In popular culture 
Gafurov is generally believed to be the prototype of the main hero of Darya Mitina's humoristic short stories - "The highest level of relations" and "Talks in bed". He is depicted as a simple-minded, naive, henpecked husband who pretends to be an ultra male chauvinist putting him in funny situations because of it.

Gafurov is a frontman at Russian Internet-TV weekly shows at www.pravda.ru : Point of view: Orient, Point of view: Economy and Point of view: Behind the Ocean.

Gafurov is fluent in Arabic and often speaks on different Arabic-language TV channels.

"Said Gafurov has been a subject to unfair criticism, ridicule, and harassment in the blogosphere, primarily in LiveJournal, and especially among schizophrenics and psychopaths of Tiparetnik. In particular, his name is distorted in the direction of insults. He was also attacked for his fat belly and the mixture of communist views and oriental flavor in the discourse".

References

Some texts by Gafurov
 The Philosophy of Equity Research. M.2013 - in Russian (Философия фондового анализа)
 The Intergovernmental Commissions and the Modernization of the Russian economy M.2011 (Межправительственные комиссии и модернизация российской экономики)
 The WTO mechanisms and non-discriminatory operations of Russian oil and gas companies in the European Energy markets" M. 2014 - in Russian (Механизмы ВТО и недискриминационный режим работы российских нефтегазовых компаний на европейском рынке)
 "The initiative "Partnership for Modernization" and the Russian national interests" M. 2013 - in Russian (Инициатива "Партнерство для модернизации")
 [The Cross, the crescent and the Arab nation: ideological currents in the Middle East - in Russian (Крест, полумесяц и арабская нация : идейные течения на Ближнем Востоке). Moscow-Berlin 2019.  https://www.directmedia.ru/book_498853_krest_polumesyats_i_arabskaya_natsiya/]
 «Разве терпимо, когда мятежом возмущаются Гракхи?»
 Gafurov's position on Syrian crisis (in English)
 Money matters. Reduction of foreign exchange reserves in the world. "Svobodnaya pressa" M.2015 - in Russian
 Attraction of risky generosity. On strange things in the international finances. "Svobodnaya pressa" M. 2016 - in Russian
 Economic policy in the crisis in 2010 M. "Russikiy obozrevatel" M. 2010 - in Russian
 Gafurov's articles in "Pravda"

1967 births
Living people
Moscow State University alumni
Economists from Moscow
Russian Marxists
Russian orientalists